Stefan Ravaničanin or Stefan of Ravanica (1670 - before 1733) was an educated monk (referred to as daskal meaning learned or teacher) who influenced many priests who he tutored and there is evidence that he was also a jeweler and icon painter. He is best known for a chronology he wrote after participating in the transfer of Prince Lazar of Serbia's relics called Očevici o velikoj seobi Srba (Witnesses of the Great Migrations of the Serbs) after the Austro-Serbian crusade was defeated by the Turks.

Like the monks of Rača monastery, it not uncommon for anonymous writers to be referred to by their first name and the name of the place with which their life or work is connected.

Stefan is one of the monks of Ravanica monastery (hence the name "Ravaničanin") who transferred the relics of Prince Lazar of Serbia from Ravanica to Szentendre and after four years from Szentendre to Vrdnik-Ravanica Monastery in the Fruska Gora mountains in what is now northern Serbia but then was part of the Habsburg monarchy or the Holy Roman Empire. He returned to old Ravanica in 1718 and there wrote his odyssey in a chronicle Pokazanije kogda prinešen Sv. Lazar veliki knaz serbski iz Serbije v Cesarijsku deržavu i v monastir Vrdnik, posle 1718 (A look at the transfer of St. Lazar the Grand Duke of Serbia from Serbia to the imperial state and to the monastery of Vrdnik, after 1718). 
"Many from all over the country, male and female, [...] fled up the Danube, some on boats, others on horses and carts, and some on foot just as poor me," described his journey, the abandoned Serbian cities, towns, villages, and monasteries in the wake of a Turkish invasion and similar accounts of Arsenije III Čarnojević, with the power of immediate experience and vivid, striking images of the transfer of Prince Lazar Hrebeljanović's relics.

See also
 Arsenije III Crnojević
 Atanasije Daskal
 Cyril Hopovac

References 

1670 births
Date of death missing
Serbian monks
People from Ćuprija